Lexus is the luxury vehicle division of Japanese automaker Toyota. It may also refer to its automobile branches:
 Lexus F, the performance division of Lexus
 Lexus LF, the line of concept vehicles from Lexus

Lexus may also refer to:
 Lexus Cup, the LPGA tournament played between 2005 and 2008
 Lexus Gauntlet, the college football competition held from 2001 to 2009
 Usha Lexus, a Shriram Group brand used for phones, furniture, and hotels in SE Asia
 Lexus Cream Sandwich, a brand of Munchy Food Industries Sdn Bhd

See also
 Lexis (linguistics), the linguistic term and variants
 LexisNexis, a proprietary online information database